Arthur Saunders Gore, 2nd Earl of Arran KP, PC (Ire) (25 July 1734 – 8 October 1809) styled The Honourable Arthur Gore from 1758 to 1762 and Viscount Sudley from 1762 to 1773, was an Irish peer and politician.

Early life
Arran was the eldest son of Arthur Gore, 1st Earl of Arran, and Jane Saunders. His younger brothers were Hon. Richard Gore, MP and Hon. Paul Gore, who married Anne Leonard (a daughter of William Leonard). His sisters were Lady Joanna Gore (wife of Philip Doyne and, after his death, Michael Daly) and Lady Elizabeth Gore (wife of Sir John Evans-Freke, 1st Baronet).

His paternal grandparents were Sir Arthur Gore, 2nd Baronet, and the former Elizabeth Annesley (a daughter of Maurice Annesley of Sherlock v Annesley infamy). His aunt, Anne Gore, was married to John Browne, 1st Earl of Altamont. His maternal grandfather was Richard Saunders (a grandson of Henry Whitfield, MP).

Upon his grandfather's death, his father became the 3rd Gore Baronet of Newtown. After his father was raised to the Peerage of Ireland as Baron Saunders of Deeps in the County of Wexford, and Viscount Sudley of Castle Gore in the County of Mayo in 1758, he was styled The Honourable Arthur Gore. When his father was made the Earl of Arran in 1762, he assumed the courtesy title of Viscount Sudley for himself.

Career
He was elected to the Irish House of Commons for Donegal Borough in 1759, a seat he held until 1761 and again from 1768 to 1774 and also represented Wexford County between 1761 and 1768. In 1773, he succeeded his father as second Earl of Arran and entered the Irish House of Lords. Arran was also appointed High Sheriff of County Wexford in 1757 and High Sheriff of Mayo in 1765.

He was admitted to the Irish Privy Council in 1771 and in 1783 he was invested as one of the original sixteen Knights of the Order of St Patrick.

Personal life
On 14 July 1760, Lord Arran married Hon. Catherine Annesley (1739–1770), the only daughter of William Annesley, 1st Viscount Glerawly and Lady Anne Beresford (eldest daughter of Marcus Beresford, 1st Earl of Tyrone). They had six children:

 Lady Elizabeth Araminta Gore, who married Henry Monck.
 Lady Jane Gore (d. 1831), who married Dudley Loftus of Killyon.
 Arthur Saunders Gore, 3rd Earl of Arran (1761–1837), who married Mary Tyrrell, the governess to Princess Charlotte of Wales who was the eldest and only surviving daughter and heiress of Sir John Tyrrell, 5th Baronet.
 Lady Anne Jane Gore (1763–1827), who married Henry Hatton of Great Clonard in 1783. After his death, she married, as his third wife, John Hamilton, 1st Marquess of Abercorn, in 1800.
 Lady Catherine Charlotte Gore (1766–1852), who married her cousin, John Evans-Freke, 6th Baron Carbery.
 Col. Hon. William John Gore (1767–1836), Master of the Horse to the Lord Lieutenant of Ireland, who married Caroline Hales, youngest daughter and co-heiress of Sir Thomas Hales, 4th Baronet.

In 1771, he remarried to Anne Knight (d. 1779), a daughter of Rev. Boleyn Knight of Otley. Before her death in 1779, they were the parents of three children:

 Lady Maria Louisa Gore (d. 1827), who married James James Knox-Gore of Broadlands Park in 1800.
 Very Rev. Hon. George Gore (1774–1844), who married Anne Burrowes, a daughter of Robert Burrowes of Stradone. After her death in 1819, he married Sophia Ribton, a daughter of Sir George Ribton, 2nd Baronet, in 1820. After her death in 1821, he married Maria Isaac, the widow of Thomas Bunbury Isaac of Hollywood House in 1823.
 Lady Eleanor Gore (1779–1812), who married Hon. Frederick Cavendish, fourth son of Rt. Hon. Sir Henry Cavendish, 2nd Baronet MP and Sarah Bradshaw, suo jure Baroness Waterpark, in 1801.

In February 1781, he remarried for the third, and final, time to Elizabeth Underwood, a daughter of Richard Underwood and Christiana (née Goold) Underwood (a daughter of Caleb Goold of Dublin). Together, they had seven children:

 Hon. Saunders Gore (1783–1813), who died unmarried.
 Hon. John Gore (–1814), who died unmarried.
 Lady Cecilia Underwood (–1873), who married, as his second wife, Sir George Buggin of Great Cumberland Place, London in 1815. After his death in 1825, she married, in contravention of the Royal Marriages Act 1772, as his second wife, Prince Augustus Frederick, Duke of Sussex, the sixth son of King George III, in 1831.She became Duchess of Inverness.
 Hon. Isabella Gore (–1838), who in 1816 married the Rev. Hon. Charles Douglas, brother of George Douglas, 17th Earl of Morton, and second son of Hon. John Douglas (a younger son of James Douglas, 14th Earl of Morton) and Lady Frances Lascelles (eldest daughter of Edward Lascelles, 1st Earl of Harewood).
 Gen. Hon. Sir Charles Stephen Gore (1793–1869), the Lieutenant Governor of Chelsea Hospital who married Sarah Rachel Fraser, a daughter of James Fraser of Nova Scotia, in 1824. Their daughter, Eliza Amelia Gore, married William Hay, 19th Earl of Erroll. 
 Capt. Hon. Edward Gore (1797–1879), who married Mary Anne Douglas in 1822.
 Hon. Julia Gore (1800–1891), who married Robert Manners Lockwood in 1821.

Lord Arran died in October 1809, aged 75, and was succeeded in his titles by his eldest son Arthur. His widow, the Dowager Countess of Arran died in 1829.

References

External links

1734 births
1809 deaths
Irish MPs 1727–1760
Irish MPs 1761–1768
Irish MPs 1769–1776
Knights of St Patrick
Members of the Privy Council of Ireland
High Sheriffs of Mayo
High Sheriffs of Wexford
Arthur
Members of the Parliament of Ireland (pre-1801) for County Donegal constituencies
Members of the Parliament of Ireland (pre-1801) for County Wexford constituencies
Earls of Arran (Ireland)